Keepsake is a third person point-and-click adventure game developed by Canadian company Wicked Studios for Linux, Mac OS X and Windows platforms. The player plays as the main character Lydia. The quest starts that Lydia investigates what happened to Dragonvale Academy as she was on her way to meet a friend there, as she arrived she noticed that the academy was deserted. Although the game was met with mixed reviews, the developers endeavour to improve the game by releasing patches.

Plot
Lydia, the main character, has just arrived at Dragonvale Academy, a school of magic. Her best friend, Celeste, agreed to meet her outside the school at a nearby fountain, but when Lydia arrives, the school is deserted and Celeste is nowhere to be found. With the help of a wolf (who claims to be both a dragon and a familiar to a powerful mage) named Zak, Lydia sets out to find out what happened at Dragonvale Academy that caused the disappearance of hundreds of people and to reunite with her best friend.

Gameplay
Keepsake is a third person point-and-click adventure game in which the user clicks areas on the screen to navigate and explore the world. The world is set up through fixed camera angles showing the portion of the area that the main character, Lydia, stands in. The user can click different locations and items to move, activate puzzles or cutscenes, and enter other areas. The game is played through exploring the world and solving puzzles to advance. The total gameplay length is estimated at 15 hours.

Development
The engine behind Keepsake is called Glyph. It is mostly built on open source projects. The developers stated that the main reason for that was the cross-platform issue. The game 3D engine is Crystal Space; it works on Linux, Mac OS X and Windows. The sound engine uses DirectSound3D, but it can also support OpenAL for cross-platform.

A patch was released for the European version which added a map of the Academy to be displayed from the game control console. The map was purely for display; the player could not use it for quick navigation to a room as in Simon the Sorcerer.

Reception
The game received mixed reviews. The game received a score of 5.2 out of 10 from GameSpot, who commented on the game's lackluster plot but interesting puzzles. IGN gave the game a 7.2 rating out of 10, noting the second half of the game "included impossibly difficult puzzles that didn't make sense most of the time". Currently the game has accumulated a 68% rating on Metacritic and 70% on GameRankings.

References

External links
Keepsake Official website (defunct)
2404.org Review

Point-and-click adventure games
2006 video games
Linux games
MacOS games
School-themed video games
Windows games
Video games developed in Canada
Video games featuring female protagonists
The Adventure Company games
Lighthouse Interactive games
Single-player video games